is a professional Japanese baseball player. He plays outfielder for the Chunichi Dragons.

On 20 October 2017, Itō was selected as the 5th draft pick for the Chunichi Dragons at the 2017 NPB Draft and on 16 November signed a provisional contract with a ¥30,000,000 sign-on bonus and a ¥5,500,000 yearly salary.

Itō is said to admire Fukuoka SoftBank Hawks third-baseman, Nobuhiro Matsuda.

References

External links
NPB.com

2000 births
Living people
People from Gamagōri
Baseball people from Aichi Prefecture
Japanese baseball players
Nippon Professional Baseball pitchers
Chunichi Dragons players
People from Aichi Prefecture